This is a list of notable events in music that took place in the year 1932.

Specific locations
1932 in British music
1932 in Norwegian music

Specific genres
1932 in country music
1932 in jazz

Events
1932 marked the lowest trough the recording industry would experience during the Great Depression. In the United States, revenues went from 104 million units in 1927 to 6 million in 1932.
January 14 – Maurice Ravel's Piano Concerto in G is premièred in Paris.
February 3–9 – Duke Ellington and his Orchestra record 2 medleys for Victor at  rpm. Over half a century later it is discovered that 2 microphone-to-cutting table chains were used, and that the session exists in "accidental stereo."
May 1 – The music to John Alden Carpenter's ballet Skyscrapers is recorded by the Victor Symphony Orchestra, under the direction of Nathaniel Shilkret; in addition to be being issued as six sides on 78 rpm discs, the recording is made available as one Victor's early  rpm LP releases.
July 1 – The very young Eddie Duchin and his Central Park Casino Orchestra, and the Three X Sisters aka, Hamilton Sisters & Fordyce record The Clouds Will Soon Roll By for Columbia records.
July 7 – Benny Carter's orchestra first records. Crown Records rejects all but one title, "Tell All You Daydreams to Me."
August 15 – First successful electrical re-recording, directed by Nathaniel Shilkret, of an orchestral accompaniment of a Victor recording by Enrico Caruso.
October 2 – Charles Seeger is divorced from his first wife, Constance de Clyver Edson.  He subsequently marries composer Ruth Crawford.
October 7 – The London Philharmonic Orchestra, recently founded by Thomas Beecham, gives its first public concert.
October 13 – Isham Jones and the Three X Sisters record at New York Studio No.1. Several songs utilized for RCA Victor were labeled "experimental" as this blues era band-leader was fusing new arrangements, and an idea that would later influence part of the Swing era.
October 19 – Frankie Laine and Ruthie Smith set the all-time dance marathon record of 3,501 hours (145 days) at the Million Dollar Pier in Atlantic City, New Jersey
October 31 – Sergei Prokofiev's Piano Concerto No. 5 is premiered in Berlin
December 13 – Bennie Moten's Kansas City Orchestra make their last record date for Victor. It becomes a singular example of early swing music.
Henry Hall becomes Director of the BBC Dance Orchestra.
Sydney Symphony comes into existence.

Published popular music
 "After You, Who?"     w.m. Cole Porter
 "Alone Together"     w. Howard Dietz m. Arthur Schwartz
 "And Love Was Born"     w. Oscar Hammerstein II m. Jerome Kern
 "And So To Bed"     w. Mack Gordon m. Harry Revel
 "April in Paris"     w. E. Y. Harburg m. Vernon Duke
 "As You Desire Me"     w.m. Allie Wrubel
 "Auf Wiedersehen, My Dear"     w.m. Al Hoffman, Ed G. Nelson, Al Goodhart & Milton Ager
 "Between the Devil and the Deep Blue Sea"     w. Ted Koehler m. Harold Arlen
 "Chinese Laundry Blues"     Cottrell
 "The Clouds Will Soon Roll By"     w.m. Billy Hill & Harry Woods
 "Dance Of The Cuckoos"     w.m. T. Marvin Hatley & Harry Steinberg
 "Darkness On The Delta"     w. Marty Symes & Al Neiburg m. Jerry Livingston
 "Eadie Was A Lady"     w. B. G. De Sylva m. Richard Whiting & Nacio Herb Brown
 "The Echo Of A Song"     Peter Mendoza
 "Eres Tú" Miguel Sandoval
 "Fit As A Fiddle"     w.m. Arthur Freed, Al Hoffman & Al Goodhart
 "The Flies Crawled Up The Window"     w.m. Douglas Furber & Vivian Ellis
 "Give Her A Kiss"     w. Lorenz Hart m. Richard Rodgers
 "Goodnight My Love" w.m. Gus Arnheim, Harry Tobias & Jules Lemare
 "Goodnight Vienna"     w.m. Holt Marvell & George Posford
 "Got The South In My Soul"     w.m. Ned Washington, Victor Young & Lee Wiley
 "Happy-Go-Lucky You (And Broken-Hearted Me)"     w.m. Al Goodhart, Al Hoffman & J. F. Murray
 "Have You Ever Been Lonely?"     w. Billy Hill (as George Brown) m. Peter De Rose
 "Here Lies Love"     w. Leo Robin m. Ralph Rainger
 "How Deep Is The Ocean?"     w.m. Irving Berlin
 "I Don't Stand a Ghost of a Chance with You"     w. Bing Crosby & Ned Washington m. Victor Young
 "I Gotta Right To Sing The Blues"     w. Ted Koehler m. Harold Arlen
 "If It Ain't Love"     w.m. Andy Razaf, Don Redman & Fats Waller
 "I'll Do My Best To Make You Happy"     w.m. Ray Noble
 "I'll Never Be The Same"     w. Gus Kahn m. Matty Malneck & Frank Signorelli from the revue After Dinner
 "I'm Getting Sentimental Over You"     w. Ned Washington m. George Bassman
 "In A Shanty In Old Shanty Town"     w. Joe Young m. Ira Schuster & Jack Little
 "In Egern On The Tegern Sea"     w. Oscar Hammerstein II m. Jerome Kern.  Introduced by Ivy Scott in the musical Music in the Air
 "Isn't It Romantic?"     w. Lorenz Hart m. Richard Rodgers
 "It Don't Mean A Thing (If It Ain't Got That Swing)"     w. Irving Mills m. Duke Ellington
 "It Was So Beautiful"     w. Arthur Freed m. Harry Barris
 "I've Got You On My Mind"     w.m. Cole Porter
 "I've Told Every Little Star"     w. Oscar Hammerstein II m. Jerome Kern
 "Just An Echo In The Valley"     w.m. Harry Woods, Jimmy Campbell & Reg Connelly
 "Keepin' Out Of Mischief Now"     w. Andy Razaf m. Fats Waller
 "Lawd, You Made The Night Too Long"     w. Sam M. Lewis m. Isham Jones
 "Let's All Sing Like The Birdies Sing"     w. Robert Hargreaves & Stanley J. Damerell m. Tolchard Evans & H. Tilsley
 "Let's Call It A Day"     w. Lew Brown m. Ray Henderson
 "Let's Have Another Cup of Coffee"     w.m. Irving Berlin
 "Let's Put Out The Lights And Go To Sleep"     w.m. Herman Hupfeld
 "A Little Street Where Old Friends Meet"     w. Gus Kahn m. Harry Woods
 "Look What You've Done"     w. Bert Kalmar & Irving Caesar m. Harry Ruby & Harry Akst
 "Looking On The Bright Side"     w.m. Howard Flynn
 "Louisiana Hayride"     w. Howard Dietz m. Arthur Schwartz
 "Love Is The Sweetest Thing"     w.m. Ray Noble
 "Love Me Tonight"     w. Lorenz Hart m. Richard Rodgers
 "Love Me Tonight"     w.m. Bing Crosby, Ned Washington & Victor Young (not to be confused with the Rodgers & Hart song listed above)
 "Lover"     w. Lorenz Hart m. Richard Rodgers
 "Lullaby of the Leaves" w. Joe Young m. Bernice Petkere
 "Mad About The Boy"     w.m. Noël Coward
 "A Million Dreams"     w. Gus Kahn m. J. C. Lewis Jr
 "Mimi"     w. Lorenz Hart m. Richard Rodgers
 "Mine"     w. Ira Gershwin m. George Gershwin
 "Minnie The Moocher's Wedding Day"     w. Ted Koehler m. Harold Arlen
 "My Cousin in Milwaukee" w. Ira Gershwin m. George Gershwin.  Introduced by Lyda Roberti in the musical Pardon My English
 "My Silent Love"     w. Edward Heyman m. Dana Suesse
 "My Sweet Virginia"     w.m. Vincent Rose
 "Night And Day"     w.m. Cole Porter introduced by Fred Astaire in Gay Divorce
 "Oh! That Mitzi"     w. Leo Robin m. Ralph Rainger.  Introduced by Maurice Chevalier in the film One Hour with You.
 "Old Yazoo"     w. Andy Razaf m. Fats Waller
 "One Hour With You"     w. Leo Robin m. Richard A. Whiting.  From the film of the same name
 "Papirosn"     w.m. Herman Yablokoff (written 1922)
 "The Party's Over Now"     w.m. Noël Coward
 "Pink Elephants"     w. Mort Dixon m. Harry Woods
 "Play, Fiddle, Play"     w. Jack Lawrence m. Emery Deutsch & Arthur Altman
 "Please"     w. Leo Robin m. Ralph Rainger
 "The Poor Apache"     w. Lorenz Hart m. Richard Rodgers
 "Precious Lord Take My Hand" by Thomas A. Dorsey, first major gospel music hit
 "Pu-leeze! Mr Hemingway"     w. Walter Kent & Milton Drake m. Abner Silver
 "Say It Isn't So"     w.m. Irving Berlin
 "Sentimental Gentleman From Georgia"     w. Mitchell Parish m. Frank Perkins
 "Sleep, Come On And Take Me"     w.m. Joe Young & Boyd Bunch
 "Smoke Rings"     w. Ned Washington m. Gene Gifford
 "Snuggled On Your Shoulder"     w. Joe Young m. Carmen Lombardo
 "So Do I"     w. B. G. De Sylva m. Vincent Youmans
 "Soft Lights And Sweet Music"     w.m. Irving Berlin
 "Somebody Loves You"     w. Charlie Tobias m. Peter DeRose
 "The Song is You"     w. Oscar Hammerstein II m. Jerome Kern
 "Street of Dreams"     w. Sam M. Lewis m. Victor Young
 "The Sun Has Got His Hat On"     w.m. Ralph Butler & Noel Gay
"Three's a Crowd"     w. Al Dubin & Irving Kahal m. Harry Warren
 "Too Many Tears"     w. Al Dubin m. Harry Warren
 "Try a Little Tenderness"     w.m. Harry Woods, Jimmy Campbell & Reg Connelly
 "Underneath The Harlem Moon"     w. Mack Gordon m. Harry Revel
 "Waltzing in a Dream" w. Ned Washington, Bing Crosby m. Victor Young
 "Wanderer"     w.m. Bud Flanagan
 "We Just Couldn't Say Goodbye"     w.m. Harry Woods
 "We've Got The Moon And Sixpence"     Oscar Levant, Clifford Grey
 "We've Got To Put That Sun Back In The Sky"     Kahal, Meyer
 "What More Can I Ask?"     w. A. E. Wilkins m. Ray Noble
 "What Would You Do?"     w. Leo Robin m. Richard A. Whiting.  Introduced by Maurice Chevalier in the film One Hour with You
 "Why Don't Women Like Me?"     Cottrell, Bennett, Formby
 "Willow Weep for Me"     w.m. Ann Ronell
 "Wintergreen For President"     w. Ira Gershwin m. George Gershwin
 "You Are Too Beautiful"     w. Lorenz Hart m. Richard Rodgers
 "The Younger Generation"     w.m. Noël Coward
 "You're An Old Smoothie"     w.m. B. G. De Sylva, Richard A. Whiting & Nacio Herb Brown
 "You're Getting To Be A Habit With Me"     w. Al Dubin m. Harry Warren
 "You've Got What Gets Me"     w. Ira Gershwin m. George Gershwin

Top Popular Recordings 1932

1932 marked the lowest trough the recording industry would experience during the Great Depression, as the record industry struggled for its existence. Only Victor, ARC (which added Brunswick) and Columbia released records, and Columbia would be in bankruptcy by 1934. In the United States, revenues went from 104 million units in 1927 to 6 million in 1932, and did not start to rebound until 1937. The top selling records of 1929 ranged from $500,000 and up, fell under $100,000 in 1930, $60k in 1931 and $20k in 1932, where they stayed for several years. Keep this in mind when reviewing sales figures. You may also notice less artists and records. Record companies were afraid of taking more losses, such as gambling on new artists and new styles. Three of the six top selling 10" 78s were recorded by Jimmie Rodgers, who would die of Tuberculosis in May 1933. They can be found on the 1932 Country (Hillbilly) page. 

The top popular records of 1932 listed below were compiled from Joel Whitburn's Pop Memories 1890–1954, record sales reported on the "Discography of American Historical Recordings" website, and other sources as specified. Numerical rankings are approximate, there were no Billboard charts in 1932, the numbers are only used for a frame of reference.

Top blues recordings
"Worrying You Off My Mind" – Big Bill Broonzy
"Mistreatin Mama" – Big Bill Broonzy
"How You Want It Done" – Big Bill Broonzy
"Searching the Desert For the Blues" – Blind Willie McTell
"Winnie The Wailer" – Lonnie Johnson

Classical music
Henk Badings
Symphony for 16 soloists
Symphony No. 2
Arnold Bax
Concerto for Cello and Orchestra
Sinfonietta
Sonata No. 4, for piano
Summer Music, for orchestra (revised version)
Symphony No. 5
"Watching the Needleboats", for voice and piano (text by James Joyce)
Arthur Benjamin – Violin Concerto
Arthur Bliss – A Colour Symphony
Marc Blitzstein
The Condemned, choral opera in one act
Serenade, for string quartet
John Cage – Greek Ode, for voice and piano (text from Aeschylus' The Persians)
Carlos Chávez
Antígona (incidental music for the adaptation by Jean Cocteau of the tragedy by Sophocles)
Caballos de vapor (H.P., sinfonía de baile)
String Quartet No. 2
Tierra mojada (for mixed choir, oboe, and cor anglais (text by R. López Velarde)
"Todo", for voice and piano (text by R. López Velarde)
Henry Cowell
Expressivo, for piano
Four Continuations, for string orchestra
Reel (Lilt of the Reel), for small orchestra
Rhythm Study, for piano
Two Appositions, for piano
Two Appositions: One Movement for Orchestra
Ruth Crawford Seeger
Ricercari (2), for voice and piano (text by H. T. Tsiang)
Songs (3), for alto voice, oboe, percussion, piano, and optional orchestra (texts by Carl Sandburg)
Jean Françaix – Piano Concerto
Gunnar de Frumerie – Variations and Fugue
George Gershwin – Cuban Overture, for orchestra
Peggy Glanville-Hicks
Fantasy, for solo violin
"He Reproves the Curlew", for voice and piano (text by William Butler Yeats)
Prelude for a Pensive Pupil, for piano
"Sheiling Song", for voice and piano (text by F. MacLeod)
"They Are Not Long", for voice and piano (text by Ernest Dowson)
"To the Moon", for voice and piano (text by Percy Bysshe Shelley)
"A Widow Bird", for voice and piano (text by Percy Bysshe Shelley)
Percy Grainger – Handel in the Strand
Camargo Guarnieri – String Quartet No. 1
Alois Hába
Children's Choruses (5), in quarter tones, Op. 42 (texts by V. Nezval)
Children's Choruses, in quarter tones, Op. 43
Fantazie No. 2, for nonet, Op. 41
Pracující den, for male choir, in quarter tones, Op. 45 (text by J. Hora)
Jascha Heifetz – arrangement of Grigoraş Dinicu's Hora staccato
Gustav Holst
"If 'twer the Time of Lilies", for two-part choir and piano, H187
Jazz-Band Piece
Jig, for piano, H179
John Ireland – A Downland Suite
Dmitri Kabalevsky – Symphony No. 1
Ernst Krenek – Kantate von der Vergänglichkeit des Irdischen, for soprano, mixed choir, and piano, Op. 72 (texts by P. Fleming, A. Gryphius, and other 17th-century German writers)
László Lajtha – Cello Sonata
Nikolai Myaskovsky – Symphony No. 11
Harry Partch – "The Lord Is My Shepherd" (Psalm XXIII), for voice and adapted viola
Paul Pisk
Campanella, cantata for voice and orchestra, Op. 28 (text after 11 poems of the Monk [Luitpold])
Little Suite, for chamber orchestra, Op. 11a
Sergei Prokofiev – 
Piano Concerto No. 5, Op. 55
Sonata for Two Violins in C major, Op. 56
Ottorino Respighi – Huntingtower, for large wind band, P. 173
Silvestre Revueltas
Alcancías, for orchestra
Colorines, for orchestra
Música de feria (String Quartet No. 4)
Three Pieces for violin and piano
Miklós Rózsa – Bagatelles for Piano, Op. 12
Arnold Schoenberg
Mirror Canon, for string quartet
Mirror Canon in four parts, for Carl Moll
Moses und Aron, opera in 3 acts (Act 3 not composed)
William Schuman
"God's World", for voice and piano (text by Edna St. Vincent Millay)
Potpourri, for orchestra
Dmitri Shostakovich
Hamlet (incidental music for the play by William Shakespeare), Op. 32
Lady Macbeth of the Mtsensk District, opera in four acts, Op. 29
Six Romances, for tenor and orchestra, Op. 21
Twenty-Four Preludes, for piano, Op. 34
Vstrechnïy (music for the film directed by F. Ermler and Yutkevich), Op. 33
Igor Stravinsky
Chants du rossignol et Marche chinoise, for violin and piano (arranged from The Nightingale)
Danse russe, for violin and piano
Duo concertant, for violin and piano
Scherzo, for violin and piano [arr. from The Firebird]
Suite italienne, for cello and piano (arranged from Pulcinella)
Suite italienne, for violin and piano (arranged from Pulcinella)
Simvol verï, for SATB choir
Virgil Thomson
String Quartet No. 2
Symphony No. 2 (arrangement for piano, four hands)
Joaquín Turina
Homenaje a Tárrega, Op. 69, for guitar
Silhouettes, Op. 70, for piano
Mujeres españolas, Series 2 Op. 73, for piano
Vocalizaciones, Op. 74, for soprano and piano
Ivan Wyschnegradsky – Prelude and Fugue, for two pianos tuned a quarter tone apart, Op. 21

Opera
Amy Beach – Cabildo (not performed until 1947)
Ottorino Respighi – Maria egiziaca
Pietro Mascagni – Pinotta
Arnold Schoenberg – Moses und Aron (first staged in 1957)
Erwin Schulhoff – Flammen
Kurt Weill – Die Bürgschaft

Film
Frank Churchill – Santa's Workshop (film)
Dmitri Shostakovich – Counterplan (film)
Max Steiner – Bird of Paradise (1932 film)
Max Steiner – The Most Dangerous Game (1932 film)
Max Steiner – Symphony of Six Million

Jazz

Musical theater
 After Dinner London revue opened at the Gaiety Theatre on October 21
 L'Auberge Du Cheval Blanc     Paris production
 Ball im Savoy (music by Paul Abraham, libretto by Alfred Grünwald and Fritz Löhner-Beda).  Berlin production
 Ballyhoo (Music: William Waller Lyrics: Robert Nesbitt) London revue opened at the Comedy Theatre on December 22
 Casanova     London production
 The Cat and the Fiddle     London production opened at the Palace Theatre on March 4 and ran for 329 performances
 The Dubarry 
London production opened at Her Majesty's Theatre on April 14 and ran for 398 performances
Broadway production opened at George M. Cohan's Theatre on November 22 and ran for 87 performances
 Face the Music     Broadway revue opened at the New Amsterdam Theatre on February 17 and ran for 165 performances
 Gay Divorce     Broadway production opened at the Ethel Barrymore Theatre on November 29 and transferred to the Shubert Theatre on January 16, 1933, for a total run of 248 performances
 Men Ken Lebn Nor Men Lost Nisht (I Would If I Could) New York City production at the Parkway Theatre in Brooklyn (includes the song "Bei Mir Bistu Shein")
 Music in the Air Broadway production opened at the Alvin Theatre on November 8 and ran for 342 performances
 Out of the Bottle London production opened at the Hippodrome on June 11 and ran for 109 performances
 Over She Goes London revue opened at the Alhambra Theatre on August 27.
 Show Boat     Broadway revival opened at the Casino Theatre on 50th Street  on May 19 and ran for 180 performances
 Take a Chance     Broadway production opened at the Apollo Theatre on November 26 and ran for 243 performances
 Tell Her the Truth London production opened at the Saville Theatre on June 14 and ran for 234 performances
 Wild Violets opened at the Theatre Royal on October 31 and ran for 291 performances
 Words and Music London revue (Noël Coward) opened at the Adelphi Theatre on September 16.

Musical films
 Carmen, starring Marguerite Namara
 Girl Crazy, starring Dorothy Lee, Robert Quillan, Mitzi Green and Kitty Kelly
 Goodnight, Vienna, starring Jack Buchanan and Anna Neagle
 Gräfin Mariza, starring Dorothea Wieck, Hubert Marischka and Charlotte Ander
 Grün ist die Heide, starring Camilla Spira, Peter Voß and Theodor Loos
 Kiki, starring Anny Ondra and Hermann Thimig and directed by Carl Lamac, with music by Rolf Marbot and lyrics by Bert Reisfeld
 Looking on the Bright Side, starring Gracie Fields.
 Love Me Tonight, starring Maurice Chevalier and Jeanette MacDonald.
 The Maid of the Mountains, starring Nancy Brown and Harry Welchman.
 The Midshipmaid, starring Jessie Matthews
 Monte Carlo Madness, starring Sari Maritza and Hans Albers and featuring the Comedian Harmonists
 One Hour with You, starring Jeanette MacDonald, Maurice Chevalier, Genevieve Tobin and Charles Ruggles
 Pergolesi, starring Elio Steiner, Dria Paola and Tina Lattanzi, directed by Guido Brignone, with music by Giovanni Battista Pergolesi 
 The Phantom President, starring George M. Cohan, Claudette Colbert and Jimmy Durante.  Directed by Norman Taurog.
 Sehnsucht 202, starring Luise Rainer
 Unshudat al-Fu'ad, starring Nadra

Births
January 26 – Coxsone Dodd, record producer (d. 2004)
January 31 – Rick Hall, record producer (d. 2018)
February 8 – John Williams, film music composer (Jaws)
February 16 – Harry Goz, musical theatre star (d. 2003)
February 24 – Michel Legrand, composer (d. 2019)
February 26 – Johnny Cash, country singer (d. 2003)
March 4 – Miriam Makeba, singer (d. 2008)
March 15 – Arif Mardin, record producer (d. 2006)
March 21 – Joseph Silverstein, violinist (d. 2015)
April 1 – Debbie Reynolds, American actress and singer (d. 2016)
April 8 – John Kinsella, Irish composer (d. 2021)
April 9 – Carl Perkins, American rockabilly singer (d. 1998)
April 10 – Kishori Amonkar, Indian classical singer (d. 2017)
April 12 – Tiny Tim, American singer and ukulele player (d. 1996)
April 14 – Loretta Lynn, American country singer  (Coal Miner's Daughter) (d. 2022)
April 26 – Francis Lai, French songwriter and film composer (d. 2018)
April 27 – Maxine Brown, American country singer (The Browns) (d. 2019)
April 28 – Marek Kopelent, Czech composer (d. 2023)
May 19 – Alma Cogan, English singer (d. 1966)
May 30 – Pauline Oliveros, American electronic music composer (d. 2016)
June 7 – Tina Brooks, saxophonist (d. 1974)
June 19 – Ernest Ranglin, Jamaican guitarist
June 21 – Lalo Schifrin, film composer
June 27
Anna Moffo, operatic soprano (d. 2006)
Hugh Wood, composer (d. 2021)
July 11 – Roquel Billy Davis, singer, songwriter and record producer (d. 2004)
July 12 – Eddy Wally (Eduard Van De Walle), Flemish Schlager music singer (d. 2016)
July 13 – Per Nørgård, Danish composer
July 16 – John Chilton, English jazz trumpeter (d. 2016)
July 19 – Buster Benton, American singer-songwriter and guitarist (d. 1996)
August 2 – John Cohen, folk musician and photographer (d. 2019)
August 23 – Sinn Sisamouth, singer-songwriter, "the King of Khmer music" (d. 1976)
September 8 – Patsy Cline, country singer (d. 1963)
September 25 – Glenn Gould, classical pianist (d. 1982)
September 28 – Víctor Jara, Chilean singer-songwriter (k. 1973)
October 9 – Alfons Kontarsky, pianist (d. 2010)
November 10 – Paul Bley, jazz pianist (d. 2016)
November 15 – Clyde McPhatter, (The Drifters) (d. 1972)
November 21 – Pelle Gudmundsen-Holmgreen, Danish composer (d. 2016)
November 28 – Ethel Ennis, jazz singer (d. 2019)
November 30 – Bob Moore, bassist (Elvis, Roy Orbison) (d. 2021)
December 5 – Little Richard (Penniman), rock singer, songwriter, pianist and actor (d. 2020)
December 9 – Donald Byrd, jazz trumpeter (d. 2013)
December 12 – Charlie Rich, country singer (d. 1995)
December 15 – Jesse Belvin, singer, pianist and songwriter (d. 1960)
December 20 – Leslie Adams, American composer and educator
December 28 – Dorsey Burnette, Rockabilly pioneer (d. 1979)

Deaths
January 16 – Joseph Kekuku, inventor of the steel guitar (born 1874)
January 27 – Mortimer Wilson, composer (born 1876)
February 22 – Johanna Gadski, opera singer (born 1872) (car accident)
March 1 – Frank Teschemacher, jazz musician (born 1905) (car accident)
March 3 – Eugen d'Albert, pianist and composer (born 1864)
March 6 – John Philip Sousa, composer (born 1854)
March 18 – Chauncey Olcott, songwriter (born 1858)
March 19 – Richard Specht, musicologist (born 1870)
April 2 – Hugo Kaun, composer and conductor (born 1863)
May 5 – Hilda Clark, music hall singer (born 1872)
May 6 – Roméo Beaudry, pianist, composer and record producer (born 1882)
May 9 – Emil Hertzka, music publisher (born 1869)
May 20 – Bubber Miley, jazz trumpeter (born 1903)
May 28 – Pascual Contursi, singer and guitarist (born 1888)
June 7 – Emil Paur, conductor (born 1855)
July 8 – Samuel Castriota, pianist, guitarist and composer (born 1885)
July 22 
Hugh Blair, organist and composer (born 1864)
Florenz Ziegfeld, Broadway impresario (born 1867)
August 16 – Pietro Floridia, composer and conductor (born 1860)
September 13 – Julius Röntgen, composer (born 1855)
September 14 – Jean Cras, composer (born 1879)
September 26 – Pierre De Geyter, composer of The Internationale (born 1848)
October 19 – Arthur Friedheim, pianist (born 1859)
October 21 – Al Hopkins, country musician (born 1889)
October 31 – Hermine Finck, opera singer (born 1872)
November 23 – Percy Pitt, organist and conductor (born 1870)
November 27 – Evelyn Preer, actress and blues singer (born 1896)
November 28 – Hubert de Blanck, pianist and composer (born 1856)
December 1 – Amadeo Vives, composer (born 1871)
December 24 – Eyvind Alnæs, pianist, organist and composer (born 1872)
December 25 – Ernst Rolf, actor and singer (born 1891)
December 26 – Dina Barberini, operatic soprano (born 1862)
date unknown
Giulia Novelli, operatic mezzo-soprano (born 1859)
Emanuele Nutile, composer of Neapolitan songs (born 1862)

References

 
20th century in music
Music by year